Hangover Music Vol. VI is the fifth studio album by American heavy metal band Black Label Society, released April 20, 2004. This album is a much more mellow affair than any other Black Label Society album, and some fans have recognized it as a nod back to Zakk Wylde's solo effort, Book of Shadows, from 1996. The album contains a piano version of Procol Harum's 1967 No. 1 song "A Whiter Shade of Pale" and a song entitled "Layne", which is written in memory of Layne Staley of Alice in Chains.

The song "No Other" is a leftover track from The Blessed Hellride sessions, which explains why Zakk Wylde played bass on this song, whereas other bassists played on the rest of the album. The song was also recorded, mixed, and mastered by the same team that was responsible for the production on The Blessed Hellride.

This was the last album that Black Label Society recorded for Spitfire Records; it was recorded as a contract fulfilling obligation, and therefore received very little promotion from the label. None of the songs from this album were performed live by the band until 2009 when "Damage Is Done" was performed.

Track listing

Personnel
Black Label Society
Zakk Wylde – guitars, vocals, bass (track 12), piano
Craig Nunenmacher – drums
John Tempesta – drums (track 14)
James LoMenzo – bass (tracks 3, 4, 6–8, 11, 15)
John DeServio – bass (tracks 2, 9, 10, 14)
Mike Inez – bass (track 1)

Production
Produced by Zakk Wylde
Associate producer and engineer – Barry Conley
Mixed by Barry Conley and Zakk Wylde
Mastered by Bill Dooley
"No Other" associated produced by Eddie Mapp, mixed by Eddie Mapp and Zakk Wylde, assistant engineered by Steve Crowder, and mastered by Steve Marcussen
Artwork concept – Zakk Wylde
Artwork assistance – Rob "RA" Arvizn
Photography – Neil Zlozower
Management – Bob Ringe (Survival Management)

Charts

References

2004 albums

Black Label Society albums
Spitfire Records albums